Rush: Beyond the Lighted Stage is a 2010 documentary film directed by Scot McFadyen and Sam Dunn. The film offers an in-depth look at the Canadian hard rock band Rush, chronicling the band's history and musical evolution. The film made its debut at the 2010 Tribeca Film Festival, where it earned the 2010 Audience Award. The film was also nominated for Best Long Form Music Video at 53rd Grammy Awards, losing to When You're Strange, a documentary about The Doors. A limited theatrical run began on June 10, 2010 and the film was released on DVD and Blu-ray in the US and Canada on June 29 of that year. John Rutsey, the band's original drummer, died in 2008; tape-recorded comments from him are incorporated into the film.

Interviews
Individuals are listed in alphabetical order.

Musicians

Non-musicians

Release
Rush: Beyond the Lighted Stage premiered on VH1 on June 26, 2010.

DVD
The 2-disc DVD features over 3 hours of video, including a 1.5 hour bonus disc of never-before-seen live performances, special features, and deleted scenes from the film.

Deleted/extended scenes
 Being Bullied and The Search for the First Gig
 Reflections on the album Hemispheres
 Presto and "Roll the Bones" Rap
 The Rush Fashion
 Hobbies on the Road
 Rush Trekkies
 Pre-Gig Warm-Up - An extended version of the backstage footage shown at the start of the film
 Dinner with Rush at a Hunting Lodge - An extended version of the footage shown during the film's closing credits

Live performances
 "Best I Can" - Live at Laura Secord High School, St. Catharines, Ontario, 1974 (with original drummer John Rutsey; part of Rush's appearance on the TV series Canadian Bandstand)
 "Working Man" - Same performance as above, also with Rutsey
 "La Villa Strangiato" - Live at the 1979 Pinkpop Festival in the Netherlands (first time this song was captured on video; recording begins at the start of the "A Lerxst in Wonderland" section, after comments by Alex Lifeson about an injured finger)
 "Between Sun and Moon" - Opening night of the 2002 Vapor Trails Tour, Hartford, CT (first live show following the band's hiatus)
 "Far Cry" - Live in Rotterdam, 2007 (from the Snakes & Arrows Live DVD)
 "Entre Nous" –  Live in Rotterdam, 2007 (from the Snakes & Arrows Live DVD)
 "Bravado" - Live in Frankfurt, 2004 (previously only available on the R30 Blu-ray version)
 "YYZ" - Live in Frankfurt, 2004 (previously only available on the R30 Blu-ray version)

Runtime of the film and bonus disc includes over three hours of content.

Reception
The film received mostly positive reviews from critics.

References

External links

2010 films
Canadian documentary films
English-language Canadian films
Rockumentaries
2010 documentary films
Rush (band)
2010s English-language films
2010s Canadian films
English-language documentary films